Dian Belmont is a fictional DC Comics character, associated with the golden age Sandman, a socialite and amateur detective, she assisted Sandman on most of his adventures as his aide and confidant. She made her first appearance in Adventure Comics #47 (February 1940), created by Gardner Fox and Ogden Whitney.

Fictional character biography

Pre-Crisis

In Dian Belmont's first adventure she was originally a thief named the Woman in Evening Clothes whom Sandman foiled a robbery by. After a few more stories her past as a gentlewoman thief was entirely forgotten and she now became the rich socialite girlfriend of Wesley Dodds and a fellow detective in his guise as Sandman. A distinction between Dian and most other superhero girlfriends was that Dian was fully aware of Wesley's Sandman identity and was a constant aid in his war on crime and less a damsel in distress. in Adventure Comics #69 (December 1941) Sandman was given a new look and sidekick in Sandy the Golden Boy, Dian disappeared from the strip and would not make an appearance for several decades until it was explained that Sandy was her nephew and that she had died sometime before the Second World War.

In All-Star Squadron 18 (dated February 1983, but set on Earth-2 in the early 1940s), writer Roy Thomas explained Dian's disappearance from the series by having Nazi spies murder her after mistaking her for the Sandman. She had donned the Sandman's gas mask costume and was investigating a suspicious fire while Wesley Dodds was out of town.

Post Crisis and Sandman Mystery Theatre

Starting in Sandman Mystery Theatre Dian Belmont's history is altered. Dian and Wesley relationship is now modeled on Nick and Nora Charles of The Thin Man with a more lighthearted rapport between the two but a much more mature view of their personal relationship. Dian's father is the District Attorney and she in now seen as a flighty party girl who after an encounter with the Sandman joins in his fight against crime. In later adventures Dian jokingly refers to herself as Sandy due to a comic that she read about a fictionalized version of herself and Wesley (in itself based on the golden age adventures of Sandman and Sandy). In her twilight years Dian Belmont became an award winning crime novelist and attracted such high profile fans as Jack Knight, also known as Starman, helping him solve one of his crimes. Dian died of natural causes and was later joined by Wesley soon after.

References

Comics characters introduced in 1940
Characters created by Gardner Fox
Fictional amateur detectives
DC Comics female characters